Cannabis in Ecuador is legal for personal consumption in quantities of up to 10 grams. The sale of marijuana is illegal. 

According to the 2008 Constitution of Ecuador in its Article 364 the Ecuadorian state does not see drug consumption as a crime but only as a health concern. Since June 2013 the State drugs regulatory office CONSEP has published a table which establishes maximum quantities carried by persons so as to be considered in legal possession and that person as not a seller of drugs. The amount of cannabis that is allowed as personal consumption quantity is 10 grams of marijuana or hash.

Cannabis for medical purposes was legalized by the National Assembly of Ecuador in September 2019 by an 83 to 23 vote.

Laws

Laws on possession of weed 
When prisons faced the problem of crowd control, a new law was enacted.

The prior rules on personal use of cannabis up to 10 grams were removed in 2013 by Attorney General Diego Garcia. According to the court, marijuana is a public health issue, not a criminal. Since then, carrying up to 10 gms of cannabis is not punishable by law.

However, Judge Diego Garcia clarified that "the law allows use and does not consider it criminal, but cultivation, trafficking, and sale of little or large amounts of drugs continue to be prohibited." With strict law, Ecuador legalizes medical cannabis.

Laws on Selling Marijuana 
Cannabis cannot be sold in Ecuador. However, the law prohibits the selling of cannabis for any reason. Instead, such offenses carry a lengthy jail term.

Law 108 of 1991 imposes a ten-year jail sentence. The rules, however, remain the same. For example, if someone is charged with other marijuana-related offenses, such as murder or drug trafficking, he might face up to 25 years in prison!

Laws on Cannabis Cultivation 
Cannabis cultivation is not commonly practiced in Ecuador. It is mostly a transit nation. As a result, the number of marijuana cultivators is significantly lower than in other South American nations.

Fortunately, cannabis production is permitted in Ecuador, but only for personal use.

However, in the prosecution's view, everyone who grows plants for his use is not a criminal, Where CBD is currently legal in Ecuador.

References 

Ecuador
Politics of Ecuador
Society of Ecuador
Ecuador
Ecuador